Theobald Butler may refer to:

 Theobald Walter, 1st Baron Butler (died 1206)
 Theobald le Botiller, 2nd Chief Butler of Ireland (died 1230)
 Theobald Butler, 3rd Chief Butler of Ireland (c. 1224–1248)
 Theobald Butler, 4th Chief Butler of Ireland (c. 1242–1285)
 Theobald Butler of Polestown (16th century)
 Theobald Butler, 1st Baron Cahir (died 1596)
 Theobald Butler (solicitor-general) (1650–1721), barrister and politician in Ireland
 Theobald Butler, 1st Viscount Butler of Tulleophelim (died 1613), Irish peer
 Theobald Butler, 14th Baron Dunboyne (1806–1881), Irish peer

See also
 Theobald Butler Barrett (1894–1969), Canadian politician